El Carmen (Santa Cruz) is a town in Bolivia. In 2009 it had an estimated population of 19,382.

References

Populated places in Santa Cruz Department (Bolivia)